Branford Center is a neighborhood and census-designated place (CDP) in the town of Branford, Connecticut, United States. The CDP encompasses the traditional town center area (roughly the area bounded by U.S. Route 1, the Amtrak railroad tracks, and the Branford River) and the area known as Branford Point (the portion of the CDP south of the railroad tracks). The population of the CDP (including Branford Point) was 5,819 at the 2010 census.

Historic district
The Branford Center Historic District was listed on the U.S. National Register of Historic Places in 1987.  The historic district represents the area of the traditional town center and excludes Branford Point. The designated portion is an irregularly-shaped  area that includes 557 contributing buildings out of a total of 706 buildings in the district, including garages, carriage houses, and other structures.  It includes two other contributing sites:  the Center Cemetery and the Saint Mary's Roman Catholic Cemetery.  The district boundaries were drawn to exclude modern construction such as the Branford High School and to exclude older buildings that did not retain their "historic architectural integrity."

Architectural styles represented in the Branford Center Historic District include Greek Revival architecture, Queen Anne architecture, and Colonial Revival architecture, Italianate architecture, Federal architecture, Gothic Revival architecture, Second Empire architecture, Colonial architecture, Tudor Revival architecture, and Bungalow architecture.  These are mostly vernacular buildings.  Of buildings designed by professional architects, the most significant is the "classically inspired, monumental 1893 James Blackstone Memorial Library," designed by Solon Spencer Beman of Chicago.  The library incorporates Tennessee marble and features a domed, octagonal rotunda.  According to the historic district nomination, "relatively little remains in Branford Center that evokes its distant 17th- and early 18th century past."  The district instead includes remnants of late 19th and early 20th century industrial, commercial, and residential history.

Industry is represented in buildings of the Malleable Iron Fittings Company and the Atlantic Wire Company. Government buildings include the Branford Town Hall, from 1857, a Greek Revival building. Religious institution buildings in the district include:
the First Baptist Church, from 1840, at 975 Main Street
St. Mary's Roman Catholic Church's rectory from c. 1925 (contributing) and church from 1974 (non-contributing)
First Congregational Church, at 1009 Main Street, a brick and stone building from 1843 in Greek Revival style, with Italianate addition from later in the century

Geography
As defined by the U.S. Census Bureau, the boundaries of the Center extend from the Branford River north along Short Beach Road (Connecticut Route 142) to U.S. Route 1 (West Main Street), then northeast along Route 1 (becoming North Main Street) to Cedar Street, north on Cedar Street to Interstate 95, and east (northbound) on I-95 to the Branford River, which forms the entire southeastern boundary of the CDP.

Branford Green

The green is typical of a traditional New England town, and serves as Branford's social, commercial, and governmental nerve center.  It is home to many small stores, restaurants, and coffee houses, (including perennial favorites like Ashley's Ice Cream and Common Grounds) and hosts concerts and other events. Notable annual events include the Branford Festival, and the used book sale held by the Friends of the Blackstone Memorial Library.

The Branford Green is lined with churches as well as the town hall; other government facilities (such as the Branford Police Department and United States Post Office), are located on nearby Harrison Avenue. A memorial to Branford's contributions during the American Civil War is to the right of the town hall. The historic Blackstone Library is situated in the western portion of the center.  It also contains five schools:   St. Mary School (grades K-8), John B. Sliney (grades K-4), Mary T. Murphy, Mary Tisko and Branford High School (grades 9–12).

Demographics
As of the census of 2000, there were 5,735 people, 2,863 households, and 1,374 families residing in the CDP. The racial makeup of the CDP was 93.50% White, 1.24% African American, 0.24% Native American, 2.35% Asian, 0.21% Pacific Islander, 0.80% from other races, and 1.66% from two or more races. Hispanic or Latino of any race were 3.80% of the population.

There were 2,863 households, out of which 20.7% had children under the age of 18 living with them, 35.5% were married couples living together, 9.2% had a female householder with no husband present, and 52.0% were non-families. 43.9% of all households were made up of individuals, and 17.9% had someone living alone who was 65 years of age or older.  The average household size was 2.00 and the average family size was 2.82.

In the CDP the population was spread out, with 17.8% under the age of 18, 6.1% from 18 to 24, 34.9% from 25 to 44, 21.5% from 45 to 64, and 19.8% who were 65 years of age or older.  The median age was 40 years. For every 100 females, there were 85.2 males.  For every 100 females age 18 and over, there were 80.9 males.

The median income for a household in the CDP was $45,102, and the median income for a family was $59,604. Males had a median income of $42,750 versus $35,866 for females. The per capita income for the CDP was $29,290.  About 3.6% of families and 4.1% of the population were below the poverty line, including 3.5% of those under age 18 and 5.3% of those age 65 or over.

See also

National Register of Historic Places listings in New Haven County, Connecticut

References

Branford, Connecticut
Census-designated places in New Haven County, Connecticut
Neighborhoods in Connecticut
Historic districts in New Haven County, Connecticut
National Register of Historic Places in New Haven County, Connecticut
Historic districts on the National Register of Historic Places in Connecticut